Treadway is an unincorporated community in Hancock County in the U.S. state of Tennessee.

Geography

Treadway is located at the junction of Tennessee State Routes 31 and 131.

References

Unincorporated communities in Hancock County, Tennessee
Unincorporated communities in Tennessee